HD 155358 b is a gas giant planet that orbits the star HD 155358, located 142 light years away in the constellation Hercules. This planet orbits at a distance about 63% of distance between Earth and the Sun and has a moderate eccentricity. The planet mass is at least 89% of Jupiter, depending on inclination of the orbit and true mass of the star. It takes over half a year to orbit the star.

See also 
 HD 155358 c

References

External links 
 The Extrasolar Planets Encyclopaedia: HD 155358 b

Hercules (constellation)
Exoplanets discovered in 2007
Giant planets
Exoplanets detected by radial velocity
Giant planets in the habitable zone

es:HD 155358#Sistema planetario